The Chilliwack Bruins were a Junior "A" ice hockey team. The Bruins played was located in Chilliwack, in the British Columbia Junior Hockey League (BCJHL).

History
The Chilliwack Chiefs were first formed in 1970 as a member of the British Columbia Junior Hockey League (BCJHL). The club was founded as a farm team for the WHL's Estevan Bruins.

After a 1975-76 season which saw the Bruins finish last in the BCJHL, the team joined the three-year-old Pacific Junior A Hockey League (PJHL). However, after an uneven performance in what proved to be a very competitive PJHL in the 1976-77 season, followed by just a single win (in 48 games) during the PJHL's 1977-78 season, the team returned to the BCJHL for the 1978-79 season, changing its name to the Chilliwack Colts.

The Colts performed poorly their first season back in the BCJHL, and competition was even tougher when the PJHL merged with the BCJHL for the 1979-1980 season. The Colts did not make it to the end of their third season back in the BCJHL, folding three-quarters of the way through the 1980-81 season, with just one victory in 35 games.

The community of Chilliwack did not see Junior "A" hockey again until the Richmond Sockeyes relocated to the Fraser Valley city after for the 1990-91 season.

Season-by-season record
Note: GP = Games Played, W = Wins, L = Losses, T = Ties, OTL = Overtime Losses, GF = Goals for, GA = Goals against

See also
List of ice hockey teams in British Columbia
Chilliwack Chiefs
Langley Chiefs
Chilliwack Bruins

References
 
 
 
 

Defunct British Columbia Hockey League teams
Ice hockey teams in British Columbia
Sport in Chilliwack
1970 establishments in British Columbia
1981 disestablishments in British Columbia